Cornus kousa is a small deciduous tree  tall, in the flowering plant family Cornaceae. Common names include kousa, kousa dogwood, Chinese dogwood, Korean dogwood, and Japanese dogwood. Synonyms are Benthamia kousa and Cynoxylon kousa. It is a plant native to East Asia including Korea, China and Japan. Widely cultivated as an ornamental, it is naturalized in New York State.

Description
Like other Cornus, C. kousa has opposite, simple leaves, 4–10 cm long. The tree is extremely showy when in bloom, but what appear to be four, white petals are actually four spreading bracts below the cluster of inconspicuous yellow-green flowers. The blossoms appear in late spring, weeks after the tree leafs out.

It can be distinguished from the flowering dogwood (Cornus florida) of eastern North America by its more upright habit, flowering about a month later, and by the pointed rather than rounded flower bracts.

The fruit is a globose pink to red compound berry 2–3 cm in diameter, though these berries tend to grow larger towards the end of the season and some berry clusters that do not fall from the tree exceed 4 cm. It is edible, with a sweet and creamy flavour, and is a delicious addition to the tree's ornamental value. The fruit is sometimes used for making wine.

It is resistant to the dogwood anthracnose disease, caused by the fungus Discula destructiva, unlike C. florida, which is very susceptible and commonly killed by it; for this reason, C. kousa is being widely planted as an ornamental tree in areas affected by the disease.

Fall foliage is a showy red color.

Varieties, hybrids and cultivars
There are two recognized subspecies / varieties:
Cornus kousa  or Cornus kousa  subsp. kousa – Japanese dogwood, native to Japan and Korea.
Cornus kousa  subsp. chinensis  – Chinese dogwood, native to China. This variety supposedly flowers more freely and produces larger flower bracts, with leaves that are also said to be larger than average. The validity of this variety, however, is questioned by some authorities.

Hybrids between C. kousa and C. florida (Cornus × rutgersensis ) and C. kousa and C. florida (Cornus × elwinortonii ) have been created by Rutgers University. Several selected for their disease resistance and good flower appearance have been named, patented, and released.

Cultivars include:

AGM cultivars
, the following cultivars have gained the Royal Horticultural Society's Award of Garden Merit: 

'John Slocock'
'Miss Satomi'
'Summer Fun'
'Teutonia'
'Wolf Eyes'
var. chinensis 'China Girl'
var. chinensis 'Wisley Queen'

Culinary and food usage 
C. kousa has edible berries. The soft pulp is sweet with a similar flavour to a ripe persimmon but the presence of hard seeds that are well attached to the pulp can be inconvenient when eaten directly. The rind of the berries is usually discarded because it has a bitter taste, although it is edible. The seeds are usually not eaten, but could be ground into jam and sauces. While less popular than the berries, young leaves can also be consumed.

Gallery

References

External links 
 
 

kousa
Trees of China
Trees of Japan
Trees of Korea
Trees of Taiwan
Flora of the Ryukyu Islands
Trees of Bhutan
Flora of Sikkim
Trees of Hawaii
Trees of the Northeastern United States
Ornamental trees
Plants described in 1866
Trees of the Great Lakes region (North America)